Luiz Marcelo Morais dos Reis (born April 10, 1990), known as Lulinha, is a Brazilian professional footballer who plays as an winger or attacking midfielder for Indonesian club Madura United.

Club career
Lulinha was born in Mauá, a Brazilian municipality in the State of São Paulo. He started as a futsal player before joining the Corinthians youth system at the age of 8. A prolific attacking midfielder, he helped the Brazilian U-17 national side to win the 2007 U-17 South-American Championship, scoring 12 goals in 7 matches. In 2007, he played in the Pan American Games and scored 3 goals in 3 games.

There is much speculation involving Lulinha's future, but at the end of 2007 he signed a new contract with his club Corinthians, committing himself to the club until 2012. Corinthian President Andres Sanchez added "To take him off Corinthians, the interested club would have to pay 35 million Euros (£24 million), and the player has 25 percent of his rights". After eleven years with Corinthians On 23 July 2009, he joined Estoril Praia on loan for one year. On 9 August 2010, he joined Olhanense, on loan from Corinthians. Lulinha was loaned to Bahia until 1 July 2012.

On 28 April 2015, Lulinha joined Botafogo.

International career
From 2007 until 2008, Lulinha was a member of the Brazil U-17 national squad. He has represented Brazil U-17s 10 times, scoring 15 goals.

Honours

Club
Corinthians
Campeonato Brasileiro Série B: 2008
Campeonato Paulista: 2009
Copa do Brasil: 2009

Bahia
Campeonato Baiano: 2012

Ceará
Campeonato Cearense: 2013

Botafogo
Campeonato Brasileiro Série B: 2015

National Team
South American Under 17 Football Championship: 2007

References

External links
Short biography of Lulinha 
 Page about 2007 U-17 South-American Championship at Conmebol's official site 

1990 births
Living people
Brazilian footballers
Brazilian expatriate footballers
Brazil youth international footballers
Sport Club Corinthians Paulista players
Campeonato Brasileiro Série A players
Campeonato Brasileiro Série B players
Primeira Liga players
Liga Portugal 2 players
UAE Pro League players
K League 1 players
Cypriot First Division players
J2 League players
Liga 1 (Indonesia) players
G.D. Estoril Praia players
Esporte Clube Bahia players
Ceará Sporting Club players
Criciúma Esporte Clube players
Pohang Steelers players
Mogi Mirim Esporte Clube players
Red Bull Brasil players
Sharjah FC players
S.C. Olhanense players
Pafos FC players
Júbilo Iwata players
Montedio Yamagata players
Madura United F.C. players
People from Mauá
Association football midfielders
Footballers at the 2007 Pan American Games
Botafogo de Futebol e Regatas players
Brazilian expatriate sportspeople in Portugal
Brazilian expatriate sportspeople in South Korea
Brazilian expatriate sportspeople in the United Arab Emirates
Brazilian expatriate sportspeople in Cyprus
Brazilian expatriate sportspeople in Japan
Brazilian expatriate sportspeople in Indonesia
Expatriate footballers in Portugal
Expatriate footballers in South Korea
Expatriate footballers in the United Arab Emirates
Expatriate footballers in Cyprus
Expatriate footballers in Japan
Expatriate footballers in Indonesia
Pan American Games competitors for Brazil
Footballers from São Paulo (state)